Ilex anonoides is a species of plant in the family Aquifoliaceae. It is endemic to Peru, and known only from the single collection that yielded the type specimen.

References

Endemic flora of Peru
anonoides
Vulnerable plants
Taxonomy articles created by Polbot